The 107th (Bengal Infantry) Regiment of Foot was an infantry regiment of the British Army, raised by the East India Company in 1765. Under the Childers Reforms, it amalgamated with the 35th (Royal Sussex) Regiment of Foot to form the Royal Sussex Regiment.

History

Early history
The regiment as first raised by the East India Company as the 3rd Bengal European Regiment, when it was formed from the 1st Bengal Europeans in 1765. It went to take part in an action at Rohilkhand in April 1774 during the First Rohilla War. It served in India until it was absorbed by the 1st and 2nd Bengal Europeans in 1798.

The Victorian era
The regiment was re-raised as the 3rd Bengal (European) Light Infantry in 1854 and then saw action in India in 1857 during the Indian Rebellion. After the Crown took control of the Presidency armies in the aftermath of the Indian Rebellion, the regiment became the 3rd Bengal Light Infantry in November 1859. It was then renumbered as the 107th Regiment of Foot (Bengal Light Infantry) on transfer to the British Army in September 1862. It embarked for England in 1875.

As part of the Cardwell Reforms of the 1870s, where single-battalion regiments were linked together to share a single depot and recruiting district in the United Kingdom, the 107th was linked with the 35th (Royal Sussex) Regiment of Foot, and assigned to district no. 43 at Roussillon Barracks in Chichester. On 1 July 1881 the Childers Reforms came into effect and the regiment amalgamated with the 35th (Royal Sussex) Regiment of Foot to form the Royal Sussex Regiment.

Regimental Colonels
Colonels of the Regiment were:

3rd Bengal Light Infantry
1862: Maj-Gen. George Huyshe, CB

107th Regiment of Foot (Bengal Light Infantry) (British Army)
1862–1868: Gen. Sir George Petre Wymer, KCB
1868–1873: Lt-Gen. William James D'Urban
1873–1881: Gen. Hon. Arthur Upton

References

External links

Honourable East India Company regiments
Infantry regiments of the British Army
Military units and formations established in 1854
British light infantry
Military units and formations disestablished in 1881
1854 establishments in India